Ober is an unincorporated community in Washington Township, Starke County, in the U.S. state of Indiana.

History
Ober was laid out in 1889, and was named after Ober Heath, an early settler. A post office was established at Ober in 1883, and remained in operation until 1976.

Geography

References

Unincorporated communities in Starke County, Indiana
Unincorporated communities in Indiana